Vegan is an unincorporated community in Upshur County, West Virginia, United States. It is known for extensive veganism and was established as an alternate lifestyle commune.

References 

Unincorporated communities in West Virginia
Unincorporated communities in Upshur County, West Virginia